The Wörld Is Yours is the twentieth studio album by British rock band Motörhead, released on 14 December 2010 as an exclusive edition, and a month later on 17 January 2011 as a standard release. It is dedicated by Lemmy to Ronnie James Dio who had died from cancer seven months earlier.

It is the first album with the UDR GmbH label of Germany and distribution by the EMI label in most territories, as Motörhead Music makes a comeback in production also.

Recording
The album was first released as an ecolbook, part of a special edition of Future PLC's Classic Rock magazine, which featured interviews with the band and the band's history. The standard CD release of The Wörld Is Yours was released worldwide several weeks later through Motörhead's own label, Motörhead Music, distributed by EMI Label Services. The album would subsequently be released in North America on 8 February 2011. Two special editions of the album were also announced. The first featured the album bundled with a bonus live DVD featuring a performance from the 2006 Wacken Open Air festival in Germany and an exclusive T-shirt. The second version featured those contents along with a signed copy of the album on silver vinyl.

Release
The band embarked on a world tour to promote the album. This included dates in the UK starting on 8 November 2010, a 27 date headlining tour of North America from January to March 2011 and a four-date Australian tour in late March. In addition, a single, Get Back in Line was released to promote the album. Subsequently a video for the track was released on 6 December 2010.

As part of the effort to promote The Wörld Is Yours in the US, the band made appearances on Conan O'Brien's late-night talk show Conan, and the NBC late night show Late Night with Jimmy Fallon, playing "Get Back in Line" at both appearances.

Reception

The album has received mainly positive reviews, with most reviewers citing the album as very similar to most of Motörhead's past works due to the band essentially following the same formula.

Eduardo Rivadavia of AllMusic reviewed the album positively and commented that it may be remembered as Motörhead's "ultimate 'rock & roll' album". Rivadavia cited I Know How to Die and Outlaw as the best tracks from the album.

Express.co.uk summed up the album as being "every bit as noisy and scary as anything they've produced over their 35 years". Dom Lawson of the UK magazine Classic Rock considers The Wörld Is Yours "one of the finest of the lot" of 20 albums the band produced, praising the production skills of Cameron Webb and the band in "supreme form (...) as they blaze through some of their strongest material in years".

On the other hand, Alexis Petridis of the Guardian said those who purchase the album will not do so "in the hope of being surprised or baffled".

Track listing

Personnel
Adapted from the album's liner notes.

Motörhead
 Lemmy – bass, vocals
 Phil Campbell – guitars
 Mikkey Dee – drums
 Charlie Paulson – scratch guitar

Production
 Produced, mixed & engineered – Cameron Webb
 Engineering – Sergio Chavez, Wesley Mischener & Josh Bierly
 Recorded – NRG Studios, North Hollywood, LA; Maple Studios, Santa Ana, California; Sage and Sound, Los Angeles during early 2010
All of Campbell's guitars were recorded by Romesh Dodangoda and assisted by Rob Thomas, at Long Wave Studio, Cardiff, Wales
 Studio Techs – Francis Ruiz, Jimmy Bomann & Steve Luna
 Mastering – Ted Jenson at Sterling Sound
 Mixing – Sarm Studios, London
 Album Design – Lemmy (sketch art & cover concept), Mark DeVito (layout/graphic design & cover concept), Steffan Chirazi (creative direction), Robert John & Pep Bonet (photography)

Charts

References

External links
 

2010 albums
Motörhead albums
SPV/Steamhammer albums